Silwerboomkloof Natural Heritage Site is a small, protected valley (“kloof”), near the Helderberg Nature Reserve, in Somerset West, South Africa. 

The name Silwerboomkloof means “Valley of the Silvertrees”. The rare Silvertree (Leucadendron argenteum) is a striking, silver-coloured tree of the Protea family, and this reserve conserves a forest of them. The iconic Silvertree is actually indigenous to the eastern slopes of Table Mountain, making the population at Silwerboomkloof a bit of an isolated anomaly.
This  reserve encloses a section of “Granite Fynbos” and “Renosterveld” and a total of around 220 species of plant have been recorded.

See also

References

 
Nature reserves in Cape Town
Protected areas of the Western Cape